The Instituto de Pensamiento Estratégico Ágora A.C. (IPEA) is a private, independent, apolitical and non-profit think tank dedicated to the construction of a free, virtuous and prosperous society. It focuses on the development of youth, research and public policy proposals.

Undertakings

IPEA University
Since 2009 IPEA University has been an annual week-long summer seminar where young students and leaders get together to discuss the world's and Mexico's most pressing issues and how to solve them.

National movement
The A Million Youths for México movement's goals are to unite 1 million young Mexicans in order to transform the country. The following five "strategic axes" guiding the vision for the movement are:
 Democratic society and rule of law
 Economic development and adaptability
 Education for the consolidation of human potential
 Governability, democracy and civil society
 Social cohesion

University chapters
IPEA University chapters develop, analyze and breakdown research to better communicate the corresponding findings to Mexican society and decision makers. IPEA first chapter started in ITESM campus Querétaro. Today it has chapter in different campus such as:

Courses
 Values 2.0.
Values 2.0 is designed to develop a culture of integrity, legality and order.
 Strategic communication.
The Strategic communication course is meant to teach rules and techniques of public speaking and communication in order to communicate in an effective and impactful manner an idea or project to a specific audience.
 Public Policies.
This course is meant to analyze the methodologies and techniques for the design, implementation and evaluation of the impacts that public policies have in Mexico.

Legion of Liberty Award
Since 2009 the IPEA together with the Ludwig Von Mises Institute has awarded the Legion of Liberty to those "individuals that have proven to be the absolute defenders of individual liberty in any given part of the world. They are catalysts of extraordinary change and are renowned for being congruent between what they say and what they do regardless of the risks and sacrifices that are involved in doing so."

International friends
James M. Buchanan, Nobel Laureate in Economics 1986.
Mart Laar, Prime Minister of Estonia 1992-1994 and 1999-2002.
Francisco Flores, President of El Salvador 1999 – 2004.
José María Figueres, President of Costa Rica 1994 - 1998.
Lord Brian Griffiths of Fforestfach, Vice Chairman of Goldman Sachs International, Director Bank of England 1983 – 1985 and Senior Adviser to Lady Margaret Thatcher 1985 – 1990.
José Piñera, Minister of Labor and Mining 1978 – 1980 Chile.
Hernán Buchi, Minister of Finance 1985 – 1989 Chile.
Antonio Martino, Minister of Foreign Affairs 1994 – 1995 and Minister of Defense 2001- 2006 in Italy.
Mario Vargas Llosa, President Fundación Internacional para la Libertad.
Andrei Illarionov, Senior Fellow The Cato Institute, Chief Economic Adviser to Russian President Vladimir Putin 2000 – 2005.
Miranda Xafa, Alternate Director and Executive Board Member, International Monetary Fund, Chief Economic Adviser to Greek Prime Minister Konstantinos Mitsotakis 1991 – 1993.
Edwin Meese III, Attorney General United States of America 1985 – 1988.
Fabián Koss, IDB Youth Program Coordinator, Inter-American Development Bank.
Harriet M. Fulbright, President The William and Harriet Fulbright Center.
Hernando de Soto, President Instituto Libertad y Democracia in Peru.
Leonard Liggio, Executive Vice President Atlas Economic Research Foundation.
Ed Feulner, President The Heritage Foundation.
Pascal Salin, Professor of Economics Université Paris-Dauphine.
John Blundell, General Director, Institute of Economic Affairs, United Kingdom.
Linda Whetstone, Chair International Policy Network, Board Member of the IEA and Atlas Economic Research Foundation.
Thomas Rustici, Professor of Economics Georgetown University and George Mason University.
Ian Vásquez, Director Center for Global Liberty and Prosperity at the Cato Institute.
John Bailey, Professor of Government and Foreign Service and Director of the Mexico Project at the Center for Latin American Studies, Georgetown University.
Carlos Alberto Montaner, Journalist and Writer.
Anna Halpine, Founder World Youth Alliance.
Barbara Kolm, Director F.A. Hayek Institute in Austria.
Christof Zellenberg, President, Europa Institut in Austria. Director of Private Wealth Management for Central and Eastern Europe, Deutsche Bank.
Alberto Mingardi, President, Instituto Bruno Leoni in Italy.
Liu Junning, President, Cathay Institute of Public Affairs in China.
Jargal Dambadarjaa, President, New Policy Institute in Mongolia.
Franklin Cudjoe, Director, IMANI Center for Policy and Education in Ghana.
Bruno Atieh, Co-Founder Youth League for Lebanon.

Board of trustees
Carlos Kasuga Osaka, Chief Executive Officer, Yakult
Daniel Servitje, Chief Executive Officer, Gropo Bimbo
Alejandro Ramírez Magaña, Chief Executive Officer, Cinépolis
Manuel Arango Arias, President, Concord Group
Nicolás Mariscal Torroella, Chairman, Marhnos Group
Femsa Group

Academic board
Carolina R. de Bolívar, Founder and Executive President Instituto Cultural Ludwig von Mises A.C.
Roberto Salinas León, President México Business Forum.
Javier Prieto de La Fuente, Head of the Department of Leadership Tecnológico de Monterrey.
Everardo Elizondo Almaguer, Deputy Governor Banco de México 2000-2008.
Alejandro Ardila Manzanera, Professor of the Department of Economics Tecnológico de Monterrey.
Gerardo Gil Valdivia, President Mexican Chapter the Club of Rome.
Pedro Ortiz Díaz, President of MSD Consulting Business Development & Strategy Design.

Board of directors
Armando Regil Velasco, President
Luis Castellanos Velasco, Director of Research
Claudia Regil Velasco, Director of Programs and Education

Partners
J. William and Harriet Fulbright Center
The Fund for American Studies
SELIDER
World Youth Alliance
Acton Institute, Argentina
Institute of International and European Affairs
Europa Institut
Atlas Economic Research Foundation
Ludwig Von Mises Institute
Universidad Francisco Marroquin

References

External links
Un millón de jóvenes por México (A Million Youths for México)

Think tanks based in Mexico
Think tanks established in 2008